Animal Fair is a traditional folk song and children's song. It was sung by minstrels and sailors as early as 1898. The song was referred to in Life magazine in 1941 as a cadence of soft shoe tap dancing.

Lyrics
The 1898 version has the following lyrics:
I went to the animal fair,
The birds and the beasts were there;
The little raccoon by the light of the moon
Was combing his auburn hair.
The monkey he got drunk,
And sat on the elephant's trunk,
The elephant sneezed and went down on his knees
And what became of the monkey?

Other versions substituted "the old raccoon" (1915) for "the little raccoon", while modern recordings use "the big baboon". "The monkey he got drunk" may be changed to "The monkey fell out of his bunk", "The monkey bumped the skunk", "You ought to have seen the monk" or "You should have seen the monk". The Barney & Friends and the Captain Kangaroo versions changed other lyrics as well.

The song may be sung as a round with the last word "monkey, monkey" repeated until the song finishes or the group repeats.

Recordings
 Sung by Woody Woodpecker in The Dizzy Acrobat (1943)
 Recorded and sung by Tex Ritter as part of Children's Songs and Stories (1948)
 Captain Kangaroo with Mitch Miller orchestra & The Sandpipers (1958)
 Sung by Richard Dreyfuss's character Moses Wine to his sons in the film The Big Fix (1978)
 Sung by Laurie Berkner in 1997
 Sung in Kidsongs: A Day at Camp (1989)
 Used as Elmyra's theme in Tiny Toon Adventures
 Sung in Barney & Friends episodes The Dentist Makes Me Smile (1993) and Barney's Super Singing Circus (2000)
 Used in Animaniacs several times

References

American folk songs
English children's songs
Songs about animals
Traditional children's songs